Mountain House may refer to:

Cities and towns
 Mountain House, Alameda County, California
 Mountain House, San Joaquin County, California
 Brush Creek, California, a community in Butte County, formerly known as Mountain House

Places or buildings
In Australia 
 Mountain House, Wingen, a heritage-listed house in New South Wales
In the United States
(by state, then city)
 Mountain House, Kern County, California, a stage station of the Butterfield Overland Mail
 Eagle Mountain House, Jackson, New Hampshire, listed on the National Register of Historic Places (NRHP) in Carroll County, New Hampshire
 Blue Mountain House Annex, Blue Mountain, New York, NRHP-listed
 Conklin Mountain House, Olean, New York, NRHP-listed
 Mohonk Mountain House, New Paltz, New York, NRHP-listed
 Railway Clerks' Mountain House, Saluda, North Carolina, listed on the NRHP in Polk County, North Carolina
 Mountain House (Chillicothe, Ohio), NRHP-listed
 Miller's Mountain House, Roseburg, Oregon, listed on the NRHP in Douglas County, Oregon
 Mountain House (Ashland, Oregon), listed on the NRHP in Jackson County, Oregon
 Schoonover Mountain House, Bushkill, Pennsylvania, listed on the NRHP in Pike County, Pennsylvania

See also
 House Mountain (disambiguation)
 Mountain Home (disambiguation)